Fred S. Martin (born April 3, 1950) is an American politician and a Republican former member of the Idaho State Senate, representing District 15 from 2012 until 2022.

Elections

Idaho State Senate

Committee assignments 
Senator Martin served as the Chairman of the Senate Health and Welfare Committee. He also served on the Commerce and Human Resources Committee, the Economic Outlook and Revenue Assessment Committee, the Joint Millennium Fund, and Joint Occupational Licensing and Certification Laws Interim Committee. Martin also served as co-Vice Chairman of the Joint Finance and Appropriations Committee from 2017-2019.

Board memberships 
Senator Martin sits on the Idaho Council on Suicide Prevention, the Idaho Health and Welfare Board, Idaho State Insurance Advisory Committee, Idaho TeleHealth Taskforce and Idaho Welfare Steering Committee.

References

External links
Fred S. Martin at the Idaho Legislature
Official campaign site
 

Living people
Brigham Young University–Idaho alumni
Republican Party Idaho state senators
Idaho State University alumni
People from Bannock County, Idaho
21st-century American politicians
1950 births